The 1996 Tour de Pologne was the 53rd edition of the Tour de Pologne cycle race and was held from 8 September to 15 September 1996. The race started in Szczecin and finished in Bełchatów.

General classification

References

1996
Tour de Pologne
Tour de Pologne